Edvaldo Izidio Neto (12 November 1934 – 19 January 2002), commonly known as Vavá, was a Brazilian footballer who is widely considered one of the best strikers of his generation. His nickname was "Peito de Aço" (Steel Chest). He played as a main striker (or centre forward) for Sport Club do Recife, C.R. Vasco da Gama, S.E. Palmeiras and the Brazil national football team.

International career
Vava earned 20 caps with the Brazil national football team between 1955 and 1964, scoring a total of 15 goals. He was in the side that won both the 1958 and 1962 World Cup, in which he scored 5 and 4 goals, respectively. Furthermore, he was a joint recipient of the 1962 World Cup Golden Shoe award, as one of the tournaments top scorers. He was also part of Brazil's squad for the 1952 Summer Olympics.

Vavá scored in the final of both 1958 (twice) and 1962 (once), thus becoming the first player to score in the final of two different world cups. To this day, only five players have achieved this feat, the other four being Pelé, Paul Breitner, Zinedine Zidane, and Kylian Mbappé. He remained the only player to have scored in two consecutive World Cup Final matches until Kylian Mbappé achieved the feat in the 2022 World Cup Final, having also scored in the Final in 2018.

Club statistics

Honours

Club
Sport Club do Recife
 Campeonato Pernambucano: 1949

C.R. Vasco da Gama
 Campeonato Carioca (Rio de Janeiro State championship): 1952, 1956, 1958
 Torneio Rio - São Paulo (Rio – São Paulo Tournament): 1958
 Quadrangular Tournament of Rio: 1953
 Rivadavia Corrêa Meyer's Tournament (Rio): 1953
 Oswaldo Cruz Cup: 1955, 1958
 Santiago de Chile Tournament: 1957
 Paris Tournament: 1957
 Theresa Herrera Trophy: 1957

Atlético de Madrid
Copa del Rey: 1960, 1961

Sociedade Esportiva Palmeiras
 Campeonato Paulista (São Paulo State championship): 1963
 Oswaldo Cruz Cup: 1962
 Guadalajara Tournament: 1963

Club América
Liga MX: 1966

International
Brazil national football team
 FIFA World Cup: 1958, 1962

Individual
 FIFA World Cup Golden Shoe: 1962
 FIFA World Cup All-Star Team: 1962
 Brazilian Football Museum Hall of Fame

References

Sources
VAVÁ Ex-atacante do Vasco, Palmeiras e Seleção by Gustavo Grohmann
Vavá… o peito de aço
Vava, Edvaldo Izidio Neto de son vrai nom

External links

 Legends of the Football World Cup
 NASL stats
 
 
 

1934 births
2002 deaths
Sportspeople from Recife
Brazilian footballers
Atlético Madrid footballers
Club América footballers
CR Vasco da Gama players
Footballers at the 1952 Summer Olympics
Olympic footballers of Brazil
1958 FIFA World Cup players
1962 FIFA World Cup players
FIFA World Cup-winning players
La Liga players
Sociedade Esportiva Palmeiras players
Brazil international footballers
Brazilian expatriate footballers
Brazilian expatriate sportspeople in the United States
Expatriate soccer players in the United States
Brazilian expatriate sportspeople in Mexico
Expatriate footballers in Mexico
Al-Rayyan SC managers
Expatriate footballers in Spain
Liga MX players
North American Soccer League (1968–1984) players
San Diego Toros players
Associação Portuguesa de Desportos players
La Liga managers
Granada CF managers
Córdoba CF managers
Association football forwards
Brazilian football managers
Brazilian expatriate sportspeople in Qatar
Qatar Stars League managers
Expatriate football managers in Qatar
Expatriate football managers in Spain
Brazilian expatriate sportspeople in Spain